Akhirul Wadhan (born 26 December 1997) is an Indonesian professional footballer who plays as a forward for Liga 2 club PSDS Deli Serdang.

Club career

Persiraja Banda Aceh
He was signed for Persiraja Banda Aceh to play in the Liga 1 in the 2021 season. Wadhan made his league debut on 7 January 2022 in a match against PSS Sleman at the Ngurah Rai Stadium, Denpasar.

Career statistics

Club

Notes

References

External links
 Akhirul Wadhan at Soccerway
 Akhirul Wadhan at Liga Indonesia

1997 births
Living people
Indonesian footballers
Persiraja Banda Aceh players
Association football forwards
Sportspeople from Riau